Gordana Komadina (born 20 April 1976 Šibenik, SFR Yugoslavia) is a former Croatian female basketball player.

External links
Profile at fibaeurope.com

1976 births
Living people
Basketball players from Šibenik
Croatian women's basketball players
ŽKK Gospić players